Paradjanov is a 2013 Ukrainian biographical drama film directed by Serge Avedikian and Olena Fetisova, about film director Sergei Parajanov. The film was selected as the Ukrainian entry for the Best Foreign Language Film at the 86th Academy Awards, but it was not nominated.

Plot 
The film tells the story of film director Sergei Parajanov. He makes great films that bring him international recognition. His defiant behavior leads to conflict with the Soviet totalitarian regime. Parajanov is thrown into prison on trumped-up charges. But an unwavering love of beauty gives strength to create, despite years of imprisonment and a ban on working in cinema.

Cast
 Serge Avedikian as Paradjanov
 Karen Badalov as Laert
 Yuliya Peresild as Svetlana

Production 
The film was created with the financial support of the State Cinema of Ukraine, ARTE FRANCE, the Georgian National Film Center and the Armenian National Film Center. The budget of the tape was ₴ 22.6 million (approximately 2 million Euros). The financial share of the State Cinema amounted to ₴ 11.3 million.

Filming took place in France, Ukraine (including the Drohobych Correctional Facility), Armenia, and Georgia.

See also
 List of submissions to the 86th Academy Awards for Best Foreign Language Film
 List of Ukrainian submissions for the Academy Award for Best Foreign Language Film

References

External links
 

2013 films
2013 biographical drama films
Ukrainian biographical films
Ukrainian-language films
2013 drama films
Ukrainian drama films